Pyrgocythara crassicostata, common name the plicate mangelia, is a species of sea snail, a marine gastropod mollusk in the family Mangeliidae.

Description
The length of the shell attains 5.6 mm.

The dark chestnut-brown shell is plicately ribbed and transversely strongly plicated.

Distribution
This marine species occurs off Jamaica and Colombia.

References

 Adams, C. B. 1850. Description of supposed new species of marine shells which inhabit Jamaica. Contributions to Conchology, 4: 56–68, 109–123

External links
 
 

crassicostata
Gastropods described in 1850